This is a list of airlines currently operating in Cape Verde:

See also
List of airlines
List of defunct airlines of Cape Verde
List of airports in Cape Verde

Cape Verde
Airlines
Airlines
Cape Verde